Bagnoles is a commune in the Aude department in the Occitanie region of southern France.

The inhabitants of the commune are known as Bagnolois or Bagnoloises.

Geography
Bagnoles is located some 10 km north-east of Carcassonne just east of Conques-sur-Orbiel. Access to the commune is by the D35 road from Conques-sur-Orbiel which passes through the village and continues north-east to Villarzel-Cabardès. The D37 comes from Malves-en-Minervois in the south and passes through the village before continuing north to join the D620 which continues to Villegly. The east of the commune is forested with the remaining two-thirds of the commune farmland.

The Clamoux river flows from north to south through the commune passing through the village then forming part of the south-western border as it flows south to join the Orbiel west of Bouilhonnac. Several streams rise in the east of the commune and flow west to join the Clamoux including the Ruisseau de la Clauze and the Ruisseau de Picharelle which forms part of the southern border of the commune.

Neighbouring communes and villages

Heraldry

Administration

List of Successive Mayors

Demography
In 2017 the commune had 308 inhabitants.

Economy
Bagnoles is located in the Indication géographique protégée (Protected Geographic Zone) (IGP) for Languedoc-Roussillon wine for Coteaux-de-Peyriac.

See also
Communes of the Aude department

External links
Bagnoles on the old National Geographic Institute website 
Bagnoles on Géoportail, National Geographic Institute (IGN) website 
Bagniolles on the 1750 Cassini Map

References

Communes of Aude